The Journal of Membrane Biology is a monthly peer-reviewed scientific journal on the nature, structure, genesis, and functions of biological membranes and on the physics and chemistry of artificial membranes with a bearing on biomembranes. According to the Journal Citation Reports, the journal has a 2015 impact factor of 1.991.

References

External links 
 

English-language journals
Biology journals
Springer Science+Business Media academic journals
Monthly journals